Ramit Tandon (born 21 August 1992 in Kolkata) is a professional squash player who represents India. He is ranked number 35 in the world and India #2 (April 2019). He turned pro in 2018 and has won 4 PSA tour titles since then. He’s an Asian Games Bronze Medalist. He also represented India at the Gold Coast CWG 2018. As a junior he won 6 Junior National Titles, several international titles and ended his junior career as India #1, Asia #2 and world #5. He captained the Indian Junior Team to a historic Gold Medal beating Pakistan in the final match. He was also part of the U-21 World Cup Team that secured the Silver medal.

He passed out from La Martiniere Calcutta in 2011 and moved to the US to continue his education at Columbia University in the City of New York, where he was the captain of the squash team. He was ranked #2 in College Squash and he ended his college squash career winning the Skillman Award(given for sportsmanship and good conduct on and off the court). He was 4 times MVP at Columbia University and also won the Maniatty Award which is given to the best student-athlete. He graduated with a BA in Statistics.

After completing university he worked in the finance industry for a few years before stepping into the professional squash world. Off the court he is seen at fashion shows, Ted Talks and other as a guest speaker at several events. In many ways he’s a youth icon and appeals to school/college students.

References

External links 
 
 

1992 births
Living people
Racket sportspeople from Kolkata
Indian male squash players
Columbia Lions men's squash players
Asian Games medalists in squash
Asian Games bronze medalists for India
Squash players at the 2018 Asian Games
Medalists at the 2018 Asian Games
Squash players at the 2022 Commonwealth Games
Commonwealth Games competitors for India
La Martiniere Calcutta alumni
Indian expatriates in the United States
Columbia College (New York) alumni